Fijian may refer to:
 Something of, from, or related to the country of Fiji
 The Fijians, persons from Fiji, or of Fijian descent. For more information about the Fijian people, see:
 Demographics of Fiji
 Culture of Fiji
 The Fijian language
 Fijian cuisine

See also
 List of Fijians

Language and nationality disambiguation pages